Target: Sparrow Unit (internationally released as Sparrow Unit: The Termination Squad) is a 1987 Filipino action film directed by Ben "M7" Yalung. It stars Ramon 'Bong' Revilla Jr., Ronnie Ricketts, Debbie Miller, Sonny Parsons, Dick Israel, King Gutierrez and E.R. Ejercito.

Ricketts won the PMPC Star Award for Best Supporting Actor.

Plot
Young idealists form the liquidation squad of the left known as the Sparrow Unit, summarily executing the perceived enemies of the people until they are cornered and eventually defeated by government. The Sparrow Unit derived their name from sparrows, birds that can adapt in any environment.

Cast

Ramon 'Bong' Revilla Jr.
Ronnie Ricketts
Debbie Miller
Sonny Parsons
E.R. Ejercito
Allan Bautista
Dick Israel
King Gutierrez
Bomber Moran
Vic Diaz
Mario Escudero
Romeo Rivera
Robert Talabis
Ernie Forte
Fred Moro
Jimmy Reyes
Ernie David
Johnny Vicar
Jose Romulo
Ernie Zarate
Ver Pineda
Connie Angeles
Lucita Soriano

Rey Tomenes
Bebot David
Lito Francisco
Boy Mediavillo
Dante Abadeza
Boy Sta. Maria
Joe Estrada

Accolades

See also
Other film depictions of the Sparrow Unit starring Ronnie Ricketts:
Target... Maganto (1988)
Ambush (1988)
Alex Boncayao Brigade (1989)

References

External links

1987 films
1987 action films
Filipino-language films
Films about terrorism in Asia
Philippine action films
Tagalog-language films
Cine Suerte films